Graham County is a county in the southeastern part of the U.S. state of Arizona. As of the 2020 census, the population was 38,533, making it the third-least populous county in Arizona. The county seat is Safford.

Graham County composes the Safford, Arizona Micropolitan Statistical Area.

The county is home to several organizations including Eastern Arizona College and the Mount Graham International Observatory, which includes one of the world's largest and most powerful telescopes. Graham County is also home to the Arizona Salsa Trail and the annual Salsa Fest.

Graham County contains part of the San Carlos Apache Indian Reservation.

History
Joseph Knight Rogers, an early settler in the area, and a member of the Arizona Territorial Legislature, is known as the father of Graham County. He introduced the bill in the territorial legislature creating Graham County. Graham County was created from southern Apache County and eastern Pima County on March 10, 1881. Initially, the county seat was located in the city of Safford but was later moved to Solomonville in 1883.  This change was undone in 1915, returning the county seat to Safford.

Graham County is named after the mountain by the same name which was named after Lt. Col James Duncan Graham, and was the first Arizona county to break the tradition of naming counties for Native Americans.

Geography
The county has various mountain peaks including Mount Graham, which is the highest mountain in the Pinaleno Mountains.

Adjacent counties
 Cochise County — south
 Pima County — southwest
 Pinal County — west
 Gila County — northwest
 Navajo County — north
 Apache County — north
 Greenlee County — east

National protected areas
 Coronado National Forest (part)
 Gila Box Riparian National Conservation Area (part)

Major highways
  U.S. Route 70
  U.S. Route 191
  State Route 266
  State Route 366

Demographics

2000 census
As of the census of 2000, there were 33,489 people, 10,116 households, and 7,617 families living in the county.  The population density was 7 people per square mile (3/km2).  There were 11,430 housing units at an average density of 2 per square mile (1/km2).  The racial makeup of the county was 67.1% White, 1.9% Black or African American, 15.0% Native American, 0.6% Asian, <0.1% Pacific Islander, 13.4% from other races, and 2.1% from two or more races.  27.0% of the population were Hispanic or Latino of any race. 16.4% reported speaking Spanish at home, while 6.4% speak a Southern Athabaskan language.

There were 10,116 households, out of which 39.0% had children under the age of 18 living with them, 57.2% were married couples living together, 13.4% had a female householder with no husband present, and 24.7% were non-families. 20.9% of all households were made up of individuals, and 9.9% had someone living alone who was 65 years of age or older.  The average household size was 2.99 and the average family size was 3.47.

In the county, the population was spread out, with 30.1% under the age of 18, 12.0% from 18 to 24, 27.3% from 25 to 44, 18.7% from 45 to 64, and 11.9% who were 65 years of age or older.  The median age was 31 years. For every 100 females, there were 112.5 males.  For every 100 females age 18 and over, there were 115.1 males.

The median income for a household in the county was $29,668, and the median income for a family was $34,417. Males had a median income of $30,524 versus $20,739 for females. The per capita income for the county was $12,139.  About 17.7% of families and 23.0% of the population were below the poverty line, including 30.2% of those under age 18 and 13.6% of those age 65 or over.

2010 census
As of the census of 2010, there were 37,220 people, 11,120 households, and 8,188 families living in the county. The racial makeup of the county was 72.1% white, 14.4% American Indian, 1.8% black or African American, 0.5% Asian, 0.1% Pacific islander, 8.2% from other races, and 2.8% from two or more races. Those of Hispanic or Latino origin made up 30.4% of the population. In terms of ancestry, 16.1% were English, 9.2% were German, 6.9% were Irish, and 4.3% were American.

Of the 11,120 households, 41.4% had children under the age of 18 living with them, 52.0% were married couples living together, 15.5% had a female householder with no husband present, 26.4% were non-families, and 21.7% of all households were made up of individuals. The average household size was 3.01 and the average family size was 3.50. The median age was 31.6 years.

The median income for a household in the county was $41,683 and the median income for a family was $48,005. Males had a median income of $41,732 versus $25,990 for females. The per capita income for the county was $15,644. About 15.9% of families and 20.0% of the population were below the poverty line, including 26.3% of those under age 18 and 9.7% of those age 65 or over.

Politics
In its early days Graham County was a solidly Democratic county. It voted for the Democratic nominee in every presidential election from 1912 to 1952, being one of only four Western counties outside New Mexico to support James M. Cox in 1920, and one of only five to support John W. Davis in 1924. Since the 1950s, however, Graham has become a reliable Republican county, usually rivaling Mohave and Yavapai as the most Republican in Arizona, and sometimes, as in 2004 and 2000, being the “reddest” of all the state's counties. No Democratic presidential nominee has carried Graham County since Lyndon B. Johnson – against Arizona native Barry Goldwater – did so in 1964, though Bill Clinton, who carried significant national rural appeal as a Democrat in the 1990s, came close in 1996.

Communities

City
 Safford (county seat)

Towns
 Pima
 Thatcher

Census-designated places

 Bryce
 Bylas
 Cactus Flats
 Central
 Fort Thomas
 Peridot (partially in Gila County)
 San Jose
 Solomon
 Swift Trail Junction

Unincorporated communities

 Bonita
 Eden
 Fort Grant

Ghost towns
 Aravaipa
 Camp Goodwin
 Geronimo
 Klondyke
 Spenazuma

Indian communities
 San Carlos Apache Indian Reservation

County population ranking
The population ranking of the following table is based on the 2010 census of Graham County.

† county seat

Notable people
 Charles Stevens, Apache/Mexican actor
 Lynda Carter, actress/singer
 Charles Dudley (né Heaslip) born Fort Grant, film actor and make-up artist
 Sarah Yeiser Mason, Academy Award-winning screenwriter
 Spencer W. Kimball, former President of The Church of Jesus Christ of Latter-day Saints, was raised in Thatcher, and lived and operated a business in Safford between 1927 and 1943.

See also

 Frye Mesa Reservoir
 National Register of Historic Places listings in Graham County, Arizona
 USS Graham County (LST-1176)
 Graham County Sheriff's Office

References

External links

 Graham County official website
 Graham County visitor information
 Graham County Chamber of Commerce

 
1881 establishments in Arizona Territory
Populated places established in 1881
Safford, Arizona micropolitan area